B73 or B-73 may refer to:
 Bundesstraße 73, a German road
 Sicilian Defense, Dragon Variation, according to the Encyclopaedia of Chess Openings
 Sutton Coldfield, according to the list of postal districts in the United Kingdom
 HLA-B73, an HLA-B serotype
 B73 (maize), a long-established maize genome